The Intergovernmental Panel on Climate Change (IPCC) is an intergovernmental body of the United Nations charged with advancing scientific knowledge about anthropogenic climate change. It was established in 1988 by the World Meteorological Organization (WMO) and the United Nations Environment Programme (UNEP) and endorsed by the UN later that year. It has a secretariat in Geneva, Switzerland, hosted by the WMO, and is governed by 195 member states. 

The IPCC informs governments about the state of knowledge on climate change, including possible response options and the natural, economic, and social impacts and risks. It does not conduct original research but undertakes periodic and systematic reviews of all relevant scientific publications by enlisting thousands of volunteer scientists and experts; observers have described this work as the biggest peer review process in the scientific community. Key findings are compiled into periodic "Assessment Reports" for policymakers and the general public. 

The IPCC is governed by its member state, which elect a bureau of scientists to serve through an "assessment cycle" of six to seven years. The bureau selects experts to prepare IPCC reports, drawing from nominations by governments and observer organisations. The IPCC carries out its activities through three working groups and a task force.

The IPCC is an internationally accepted authority on climate change. Its findings are endorsed by leading climate scientists and all member governments, while its reports are regularly cited by media, governments, civil society organisations and businesses. IPCC reports play a key role in the annual climate negotiations held by the United Nations Framework Convention on Climate Change (UNFCCC); the Fifth Assessment Report influenced the landmark Paris Agreement in 2015. The IPCC shared the 2007 Nobel Peace Prize with Al Gore for contributions to the understanding of climate change. 

In 2015, the IPCC began its sixth assessment cycle, to be completed in 2023. In August 2021, the IPCC published its Working Group I contribution to the Sixth Assessment Report (IPCC AR6) on the physical science basis of climate change. The Guardian described this report as the "starkest warning yet" of "major inevitable and irreversible climate changes". Many newspapers around the world echoed this theme.

Origins 
The predecessor of the IPCC was the Advisory Group on Greenhouse Gases (AGGG). Three organizations set up the AGGG in 1986. These were the International Council of Scientific Unions, the United Nations Environment Programme (UNEP), and the World Meteorological Organization (WMO). The AGGG reviewed scientific research on greenhouse gases. It also studied increases in greenhouse gases. Climate science was becoming more complicated and covering more disciplines. This small group of scientists lacked the resources to cover climate science. 

The United States Environmental Protection Agency sought an international convention to restrict greenhouse gas emissions. The Reagan Administration worried that independent scientists would have too much influence. The WMO and UNEP therefore created the IPCC as an intergovernmental body in 1988. Scientists take part in the IPCC as both experts and government representatives. The IPCC produces reports backed by all leading relevant scientists. Member governments must also endorse the reports by consensus agreement. So the IPCC is both a scientific body and an organization of governments. Its job is to tell governments what scientists know about climate change. It also examines the impacts of climate change and options for dealing with it. The IPCC does this by assessing peer-reviewed scientific literature.

The United Nations endorsed the creation of the IPCC in 1988. The General Assembly resolution noted that human activity could change the climate. This could lead to severe economic and social consequences. It said increasing concentrations of greenhouse gases could warm the planet. This would cause the sea level to rise. The effects for humanity would be disastrous if timely steps were not taken.

Organization

Way of working 
The IPCC does not conduct original research. It produces comprehensive assessments on the state of knowledge of climate change. It prepares reports on special topics relevant to climate change. It also produces methodologies. These methodologies help countries estimate their greenhouse gas emissions and removals through sinks. Its assessments build on previous reports and scientific publications. Over the course of six assessments the reports reflect the growing evidence for a changing climate. And they show how this is due to human activity.

Rules and governing principles 
The IPCC has adopted its rules of procedure in the "Principles Governing IPCC Work". These state that the IPCC will assess:
 the risk of climate change caused by human activities,
 its potential impacts, and
 possible options for prevention.
Under IPCC rules its assessments are comprehensive, objective, open and transparent. They cover all the information relevant to the scientific understanding of climate change. This draws on scientific, technical and socioeconomic information. IPCC reports must be neutral regarding policy recommendations. However, they may address the objective factors relevant to enacting policies.

Structure 
The IPCC has the following structure:
 IPCC Panel: Meets in plenary session about twice a year. It may meet more often for the approval of reports. It controls the IPCC's structure, procedures, work program and budget. It accepts and approves IPCC reports. The Panel is the IPCC corporate entity.
 Chair: Elected by the Panel. Chairs the Bureau and other bodies. Represents the organization.
 Bureau: Elected by the Panel. It currently has 34 members from different geographic regions. Besides the Chair and three IPCC Vice-Chairs, they provide the leadership for the IPCC's three Working Groups and Task Force. It provides guidance to the Panel on the scientific and technical aspects of its work.
 Working Groups: Each has two Co-Chairs, one from a developed and one from a developing country. A technical support unit supports each Working Group. Working Group sessions approve the Summary for Policymakers of assessment and special reports. Each Working Group has a Bureau. This consists of its Co-Chairs and Vice-Chairs, who are also members of the IPCC Bureau.
 Working Group I: Assesses scientific aspects of the climate system and climate change. Co-Chairs: Valérie Masson-Delmotte and Panmao Zhai
 Working Group II: Assesses the impacts of climate change on human and natural systems. Assesses adaptation options. Co-Chairs: Hans-Otto Pörtner and Debra Roberts
 Working Group III: Assesses how to stop climate change by limiting greenhouse gas emissions. (Known as "mitigation".) Co-Chairs: Priyadarshi R. Shukla and Jim Skea
 Task Force on National Greenhouse Gas Inventories. Develops methodologies for estimating greenhouse gas emissions. Co-Chairs: Kiyoto Tanabe and Eduardo Calvo Buendía
 Task Force Bureau: Comprises the two Co-Chairs, who are also members of the IPCC Bureau, and 12 members.
 Executive Committee: Comprises the Chair, IPCC Vice-Chairs and the Co-Chairs of the Working Groups and Task Force. It addresses urgent issues that arise between sessions of the Panel.
 Secretariat: Administers activities, supports the Chair and Bureau, point of contact for governments. Supported by UNEP and the WMO.

Chair 
The chair of the IPCC is Korean economist Hoesung Lee. Lee has served since 8 October 2015 with the election of the new IPCC Bureau. His predecessor Rajendra K. Pachauri, elected in 2002, resigned in February 2015. Vice-Chair Ismail El Gizouli served as acting chair until the election of the new Bureau. The previous chairs were Robert Watson, elected in 1997, and Bert Bolin, elected in 1988.

Panel 
The Panel consists of representatives appointed by governments. They take part in plenary sessions of the IPCC and its Working Groups. Non-governmental and intergovernmental organizations may attend as observers. Meetings of IPCC bodies are by invitation only. About 500 people from 130 countries attended the 48th Session of the Panel in Incheon, Republic of Korea. This took place in October 2018. They included 290 government officials and 60 representatives of observer organizations. The opening ceremonies of sessions of the Panel and of Lead Author Meetings are open to media. Otherwise, IPCC meetings are closed.

Funding 
The IPCC receives funding through a dedicated trust fund. UNEP and the WMO established the fund in 1989. The trust fund receives annual financial contributions from member governments. The WMO, UNEP and other organizations also contribute. Payments are voluntary and there is no set amount required. The WMO covers the operating costs of the secretariat. It also sets the IPCC's financial regulations and rules. The Panel sets the annual budget.

List of all reports

Activities other than report preparation 
The IPCC bases its work on the decisions of the WMO and UNEP, which established the IPCC. It also supports the work of the UNFCCC. The main work of the IPCC is to prepare assessment and other reports. It also supports other activities such as the Data Distribution Centre. This helps manage data related to IPCC reports. 

The IPCC has a "Gender Policy and Implementation Plan" to pay attention to gender in its work. It aims to carry out its work in an inclusive and respectful manner. The IPCC aims for balance in participation in IPCC work. This should offer all participants equal opportunity.

Communications and dissemination activities 
The IPCC enhanced its communications activities for the Fifth Assessment Report. For instance it made the approved report and press release available to registered media under embargo before the release. And it expanded its outreach activities with an outreach calendar. The IPCC held an Expert Meeting on Communication in February 2016, at the start of the Sixth Assessment Report cycle. Members of the old and new Bureaus worked with communications experts and practitioners at this meeting. This meeting produced a series of recommendations. The IPCC adopted many of them. One was to bring people with communications expertise into the Working Group Technical Support Units. Another was to consider communications questions early on in the preparation of reports.

Following these steps in communications, the IPCC saw a significant increase in media coverage of its reports. This was particularly the case with the Special Report on Global Warming of 1.5 °C in 2018 and Climate Change 2021: The Physical Science Basis, the Working Group I contribution to the Sixth Assessment Report, in 2021. There was also much greater public interest, reflected in the youth and other movements that emerged in 2018.

IPCC reports are important for public awareness of climate change and related policymaking. This has led to a number of academic studies of IPCC communications, for example in 2021.

Archiving 
The IPCC archives its reports and electronic files on its website. They include the review comments on drafts of reports. The Environmental Science and Public Policy Archives in the Harvard Library also archives them..

Assessment reports

Between 1990 and 2022, the IPCC has published six comprehensive assessment reports reviewing the latest climate science. The IPCC has also produced 14 special reports on particular topics. Each assessment report has four parts. These are a contribution from each of the three working groups, plus a synthesis report. The synthesis report integrates the working group contributions. It also integrates any special reports produced in that assessment cycle.

Review process of scientific literature 
The IPCC does not carry out its own research. It does not monitor climate-related data. The reports by IPCC assess scientific papers and independent results from other scientific bodies. The IPCC sets a deadline for publication of scientific papers that a report will cover. That report will not include new information that emerges after this deadline. However, there is a steady evolution of key findings and levels of scientific confidence from one assessment report to the next. Each IPCC report notes areas where the science has improved since the previous report. It also notes areas that would benefit from further research.

Selection and role of authors

The IPCC Bureau or Working Group Bureau selects the authors of the reports from government nominations. Lead authors of IPCC reports assess the available information about climate change based on published sources. According to IPCC guidelines, authors should give priority to peer-reviewed sources. Authors may refer to non-peer-reviewed sources ("grey literature"), if they are of sufficient quality. These could include reports from government agencies and non-governmental organizations. Industry journals and model results are other examples of non-peer-reviewed sources.

Authors prepare drafts of a full report divided into chapters. They also prepare a technical summary of the report, and a summary for policymakers.

Each chapter has a number of authors to write and edit the material. A typical chapter has two coordinating lead authors, ten to fifteen lead authors and a larger number of contributing authors. The coordinating lead authors assemble the contributions of the other authors. They ensure that contributions meet stylistic and formatting requirements. They report to the Working Group co-chairs. Lead authors write sections of chapters. They invite contributing authors to prepare text, graphs or data for inclusion.

The Bureau aims for a range of views, expertise and geographical representation in its choice of authors. This ensures the author team includes experts from both developing and developed countries. The Bureau also seeks a balance between male and female authors. And it aims for a balance between those who have worked previously on IPCC reports and those new to the process.

Scientists who work as authors on IPCC reports do not receive any compensation for this work. They depend on the salaries they receive from their home institutions or other work. The work is labour-intensive with a big time commitment. It can disrupt participating scientists' research. This has led to concern that the IPCC process may discourage qualified scientists from participating.

Review process for assessment reports 
Expert reviewers comment at different stages on the drafts. Reviewers come from member governments and IPCC observers. Also, anyone may become an IPCC reviewer by stating they have the relevant expertise.

There are generally three stages in the review process. First comes expert review of the first draft of the chapters. The next stage is a review by governments and experts of the revised draft of the chapters and the first draft of the Summary for Policymakers. The third stage is a government review of the revised Summary for Policymakers. Review comments and author responses remain in an open archive for at least five years. Finally government representatives together with the authors review the Summary for Policymakers. They go through the Summary for Policymakers line by line to ensure it is a good summary for the underlying report. This final review of the Summary of Policymakers takes place at sessions of the responsible working group or of the Panel.

There are several types of endorsement which documents receive:
 Approval - Material has been subject to detailed, line by line discussion and agreement. (The relevant Working Groups approve Working Group Summaries for Policymakers. The Panel approves the Synthesis Report Summary for Policymakers.)
 Adoption - Endorsed section by section (not line by line). (The Panel adopts the full IPCC Synthesis Report. It also adopts Overview Chapters of Methodology Reports.)
 Acceptance - Not been subject to line by line discussion and agreement. But it presents a comprehensive, objective and balanced view of the subject matter. (Working Groups accept their reports. The Panel accepts Working Group Summaries for Policymakers after working group approval. The Panel accepts Methodology Reports.)

Key findings and impacts

Assessment reports one to five (1990 to 2014)
 
 The IPCC’s First Assessment Report (FAR) appeared in 1990. The report gave a broad overview of climate change science. It discussed uncertainties and provided evidence of warming. The authors said they are certain that greenhouse gases are increasing in the atmosphere because of human activity. This is resulting in more warming of the Earth's surface. The report led to the establishment of the United Nations Framework Convention on Climate Change (UNFCCC).
 The Second Assessment Report (SAR), was published in 1995. It strengthened the findings of the First Assessment Report. The evidence suggests that there is a discernible human influence on the global climate, it said. The Second Assessment Report provided important material for the negotiations leading to the UNFCCC’s Kyoto Protocol.
 The Third Assessment Report (TAR) was completed in 2001. It found more evidence that most of the global warming seen over the previous 50 years was due to human activity. The report includes a graph reconstructing global temperature since the year 1000. The sharp rise in temperature in recent years gave it the name "hockey stick". This became a powerful image of how temperature is soaring with climate change. The report also shows how adaptation to the effects of climate change can reduce some of its ill effects.
 The IPCC’s Fourth Assessment Report (AR4) was published in 2007. It gives much greater certainty about climate change. It states: "Warming of the climate system is unequivocal..." The report helped make people around the world aware of climate change. The IPCC shared the Nobel Peace Prize in the year of the report’s publication for this work (see below).
 The Fifth Assessment Report (AR5) was published in 2013 and 2014. This report again stated the fact of climate change. It warned of the dangerous risks. And it emphasized how the world can counter climate change. Three key findings were for example: Firstly, human influence on the climate system is clear. Secondly, the more we disrupt our climate, the more we risk severe, pervasive and irreversible impacts. And thirdly, we have the means to limit climate change and build a more prosperous, sustainable future. The report's findings were the scientific foundation of the UNFCCC’s 2015 Paris Agreement.

Sixth assessment report (2021/2022)
The IPCC's most recent report is the Sixth Assessment Report (AR6). The first three instalments of AR6 appeared in 2021 and 2022. Its final synthesis report is due in March 2023. 

The IPCC published the Working Group I report, Climate Change 2021: The Physical Science Basis, in August 2021. It confirms that the climate is already changing in every region. Many of these changes have not been seen in thousands of years. Many of them such as sea-level rise are irreversible over hundreds of thousands of years. Strong reductions in greenhouse gas emissions would limit climate change. But it could take 20-30 years for the climate to stabilize. This report attracted enormous media and public attention. U.N. Secretary-General António Guterres described it as "code red for humanity". 

The IPCC published the Working Group II report, Climate Change 2022: Impacts, Adaptation and Vulnerability, in February 2022. Climate change due to human activities is already affecting the lives of billions of people, it said. It is disrupting nature. The world faces unavoidable hazards over the next two decades even with global warming of 1.5ºC, it said. 

The IPCC published the Working Group III report, Climate Change 2022: Mitigation of Climate Change, in April 2022. It will be impossible to limit warming to 1.5ºC without immediate and deep cuts in greenhouse gas emissions. It is still possible to halve emissions by 2050, it said.

Other reports

Special reports
The IPCC also publishes other types of reports. It produces Special Reports on topics proposed by governments or observer organizations. Between 1994 and 2019 the IPCC published 14 special reports. Now usually more than one working group cooperates to produce a special report. The preparation and approval process is the same as for assessment reports.

Special reports in 2011 
During the fifth assessment cycle the IPCC produced two special reports. It completed the Special Report on Renewable Energy Sources and Climate Change Mitigation (SRREN) in 2011. Working Group III prepared this report. The report examined options to use different types of renewable energy to replace fossil fuels. The report noted that the cost of most renewables technologies had fallen. It was likely to fall even more with further advances in technology. It said renewables could increase access to energy. The report reviewed 164 scenarios that examine how renewables could help stop climate change. In more than half of these scenarios, renewables would contribute more than 27% of primary energy supply in mid-century. This would be more than double the 13% share in 2008. In the scenarios with the highest shares for renewable energy, it contributes 77% by 2050.

Later in 2011 the IPCC released the Special Report on Managing the Risks of Extreme Events and Disasters to Advance Climate Change Adaptation (SREX). This was a collaboration between Working Groups I and II. It was the first time two IPCC working groups worked together on a special report. The report shows how climate change has contributed to changes in extreme weather. And it show how policies to avoid and prepare for extreme weather events can reduce their impact. In the same way policies to respond to events and recover from them can make societies more resilient.

Special reports 2018-2019 
During the sixth assessment cycle the IPCC produced three special reports. This made it the most ambitious cycle in IPCC history. The UNFCCC set a goal of keeping global warming well below 2ºC while trying to hold it at 1.5ºC, when it reached the Paris Agreement at COP21 in 2015. But at the time there was little understanding of what warming of 1.5ºC meant. There was little scientific research explaining how the impacts of 1.5ºC would differ from 2ºC. And there was little understanding about how to keep warming to 1.5ºC. So the UNFCCC invited the IPCC to prepare a report on global warming of 1.5ºC. All three IPCC working groups collaborated to produce the report. The IPCC released the Special Report on Global Warming of 1.5 °C (SR15) in 2018. The report showed that it was possible to keep warming below 1.5ºC during the 21st century. But this would mean deep cuts in emissions. It would also mean rapid, far-reaching changes in all aspects of society. The report showed warming of 2ºC would have much more severe impacts than 1.5ºC. In other words: every bit of warming matters. SR15 had an unprecedented impact for an IPCC report in the media and with the public. It put the 1.5ºC target at the center of climate activism. 

In 2019 the IPCC released two more special reports that examine different parts of the climate system. The Special Report on Climate Change and Land (SRCCL) examined how the way we use land affects the climate. It looked at emissions from activities such as farming and forestry rather than from energy and transport. It also looked at how climate change is affecting land. All three IPCC working groups and its Task Force on National Greenhouse Gas Inventories collaborated on the report. The report found that climate change is adding to the pressures we are putting on our land we use to live on and grow our food. It will only be possible to keep warming well below 2ºC if we reduce emissions from all sectors including land and food, it said.

The Special Report on the Ocean and Cryosphere in a Changing Climate (SROCC) examined how the ocean and frozen parts of the planet interact with climate change. (The cryosphere includes frozen systems such as ice sheets, glaciers and permafrost.) IPCC Working Groups I and II prepared the report. The report highlighted the need to tackle unprecedented changes in the ocean and cryosphere. It also showed how adaptation could help sustainable development.

Methodology Reports
The IPCC has a National Greenhouse Gas Inventories Programme. It develops methodologies and software for countries to report their greenhouse gas emissions. The IPCC’s Task Force on National Greenhouse Gas Inventories (TFI) has managed the program since 1998. Japan’s Institute for Global Environmental Strategies (IGES) hosts the TFI’s Technical Support Unit.

The IPCC approves its methodology reports at sessions of the Panel. The Panel adopts the Methodology Report’s Overview Chapter by endorsing it section by section.

Revised 1996 IPCC Guidelines 
The IPCC released its first Methodology Report, the IPCC Guidelines for National Greenhouse Gas Inventories, in 1994. The Revised 1996 IPCC Guidelines for National Greenhouse Gas Inventories updated this report. Two "good practice reports" complete these guidelines. These are the Good Practice Guidance and Uncertainty Management in National Greenhouse Gas Inventories and Good Practice Guidance for Land Use, Land-Use Change and Forestry. Parties to the UNFCCC and its Kyoto Protocol use the 1996 guidelines and two good practice reports for their annual submissions of inventories.

2006 IPCC Guidelines 
The 2006 IPCC Guidelines for National Greenhouse Gas Inventories further update these methodologies. They include a large number of "default emission factors". These are factors to estimate the amount of emissions for an activity. The IPCC prepared this new version of the guidelines at the request of the UNFCCC. The UNFCCC accepted them for use at its 2013 Climate Change Conference, COP19, in Warsaw. The IPCC added further material in its 2019 Refinement to the 2006 IPCC Guidelines for National Greenhouse Gas Inventories.

The TFI has started preparations for a methodology report on short-lived climate forcers (SLCFs). It will complete this report in the next assessment cycle, the seventh.

Challenges and controversies 
IPCC reports also attract criticism. Criticisms come from both people who say the reports exaggerate the risks and people who say they understate them. The IPCC consensus approach has faced internal and external challenges.

Conservative nature of IPCC reports
Some critics have argued that IPCC reports tend to be conservative. They say the reports consistently underestimate the pace and impacts of global warming. This leads to findings that are the "lowest common denominator", they say. Stefan Rahmstorf, professor of physics and oceanography at Potsdam University, stated in 2007: "In a way, it is one of the strengths of the IPCC to be very conservative and cautious and not overstate any climate change risk". IPCC reports aim to inform policymakers about the state of knowledge on climate change. They do this by assessing the findings of the thousands of scientific papers available on the subject at a given time. Individual publications may have different conclusions to IPCC reports. This includes those appearing just after the release of an IPCC report. This can lead to criticism that the IPCC is either alarmist or conservative. New findings must wait for the next assessment for consideration.

Potential political influence 
A memo by ExxonMobil to the Bush administration in the United States in 2002 was an example of possible political influence on the IPCC.  The memo led to strong Bush administration lobbying to oust Robert Watson, a climate scientist, as IPCC chair. They sought to replace him with Rajendra Pachauri. Many considered Pachauri at the time as more mild-mannered and industry-friendly.

Governments form the membership of the IPCC. They are the prime audience for IPCC reports. IPCC rules give them a formal role in the scoping, preparation and approval of reports. For instance governments take part in the review process and work with authors to approve the Summary for Policymakers of reports. But some activists have argued that governments abuse this role to influence the outcome of reports.

Controversy and review after Fourth Assessment Report in 2007 
The IPCC came under unprecedented media scrutiny in 2009 in the run-up to the Copenhagen climate conference. This "Climatic Research Unit email controversy" involved the leak of emails from climate scientists. Many of these scientists were authors of the Fourth Assessment Report which came out in 2007. The discovery of an error in this report that the Himalayan glaciers would melt by 2035 put the IPCC under further pressure. Scientific bodies upheld the general findings of the Fourth Assessment Report and the IPCC’s approach. But many people thought the IPCC should review the way it works.

InterAcademy Council review in 2010 
The United Nations Secretary-General and the Chair of the IPCC asked the InterAcademy Council (IAC) in March 2010 to review the IPCC's processes for preparing its reports. The IAC panel, chaired by Harold Tafler Shapiro, released its report on 1 September 2010. The IAC panel made seven formal recommendations for improving the IPCC's assessment process. The IPCC implemented most of the review's recommendations by 2012. One of these was the introduction of a protocol to handle errors in reports. Other recommendations included strengthening the science-review process and improving communications. But the IPCC did not adopt the proposal to appoint a full-time executive secretary.

Issues with consensual approach 

Michael Oppenheimer, a long-time participant in the IPCC, has said the IPCC consensus approach has some limitations. Oppenheimer, a coordinating lead author of the Fifth Assessment Report, called for concurring, smaller assessments of special problems instead of the large-scale approach of previous IPCC assessments. Others see "mixed blessings" in the drive for consensus within the IPCC. They suggest including dissenting or minority positions.  Others suggest improving statements about uncertainties.

Endorsements and awards 
IPCC reports are the benchmark for climate science. There is widespread support for the IPCC in the scientific community. Publications by other scientific bodies and experts show this. Many scientific bodies have issued official statements that endorse the findings of the IPCC. For example:
 For the Third Assessment Report in 2001 endorsements came from the Canadian Foundation for Climate and Atmospheric Sciences, United States National Research Council and European Geosciences Union.
 For the Fourth Assessment Report in 2007 endorsements came from the International Council for Science (ICSU), and the Network of African Science Academies.

Nobel Peace Prize in 2007 

In December 2007, the IPCC received the Nobel Peace Prize "for their efforts to build up and disseminate greater knowledge about man-made climate change, and to lay the foundations for the measures that are needed to counteract such change". It shared the award with former U.S. Vice-president Al Gore for his work on climate change and the documentary An Inconvenient Truth.

Gulbenkian Prize for Humanity in 2022

In October 2022, the IPCC and IPBES shared the Gulbenkian Prize for Humanity. The two intergovernmental bodies won the prize because they "produce scientific knowledge, alert society, and inform decision-makers to make better choices for combatting climate change and the loss of biodiversity".

See also

References

External links
 
  of IPCC Data Distribution Centre (Climate data and guidance on its use)

 
International climate change organizations
Organizations awarded Nobel Peace Prizes
United Nations Environment Programme
Working groups
World Meteorological Organization
Environmental organizations established in 1988
Scientific organizations established in 1988
Organisations based in Geneva
Swiss Nobel laureates